Margret Else Schleidt (born Margret Else Zimmer on July 20, 1928, in Duisburg, died March 13, 2012, in Andechs) was a German human ethologist. She worked at the Max-Planck-Institut für Verhaltensphysiologie, which has now become the Max-Planck Institute for Ornithology.

Margret Else Schleidt studied Biology at the Universities of Bonn, Zurich and Freiburg. She did her dissertation  research in animal ethology at Konrad Lorenz’s research station in Buldern Westfalen. She then completed her PhD in animal ethology in 1955 under the supervision of Professor Otto Koehler in Freiburg i Br., before working as part of Konrad Lorenz’ research group at the Max-Planck-Institut für Verhaltensphysiologie in Seewiesen. At that time, she worked with Wolfgang Schleidt on ornithological projects. From 1963 to 1974, Margret Schleidt was secretary to the Lorenz group.

In 1974, she joined of the Human Ethology group led by Irenäus Eibl-Eibesfeldt in Seewiesen. Her research focus was on human communication. She wrote papers on the importance of olfaction, mother-child relationships, and rhythmic movement phenomena. Importantly, she discovered that various repeated behaviours such as stirring while cooking, scratching, and other non-repeated behaviours had a three-second rhythm, in different human cultures, as well as in chimpanzees and baboons. In addition, she advised students writing their dissertations.

In 1987, she taught human ethology at the University of Munich, and from 1990 to 2010 at the University of Innsbruck with her colleagues Gerhard Medicus and Wulf Schiefenhövel.  Her research and lectures influenced the work of colleagues in her field, and she was cited by many including Konrad Lorenz, Irenäus Eibl-Eibesfeldt, Wulf Schiefenhövel
 and others.

Selected publications
 Schleidt, M.: "Handeln und Wahrnehmen im Sekundenbereich". In: Konrad Lorenz und seine verhaltensbiologischen Konzepte aus heutiger Sicht, pp. 303–312 (Hg. Kotrschal, K.; Müller, G.; Winkler, H.). Filander, Fürth (2002)
 
 
 Medicus, G.; Schleidt, M.; Eibl-Eibesfeldt, I.: :Universelle Zeitkonstante bei Bewegungen taubblinder Kinder". Der Nervenarzt 65 (9), pp. 598–601 (1994)
 Schleidt, M.; Medicus, G.; Schiefenhövel, W.: "Humanethologie und Vorgeschichte". Praxis Geschichte 6, pp. 44–49 (1994)
 
 
 
 
 Schleidt, M.: Personal odor and nonverbal-communication. Ethology and Sociobiology 1 (3), pp. 225–231 (1980) (doi: 10.1016/0162-3095(80)90009-6)

References 

Ethologists
20th-century German biologists
German women biologists
1928 births
2012 deaths
People from Duisburg
Academic staff of the University of Innsbruck
Medical anthropologists
German anthropologists
Women ethologists
Academic staff of the Ludwig Maximilian University of Munich
German women anthropologists
20th-century German women scientists
21st-century German biologists